28439 Miguelreyes, provisional designation , is a background asteroid from the central region of the asteroid belt, approximately 3.9 kilometers in diameter. The asteroid was discovered on 3 January 2000, by the LINEAR team at Lincoln Lab's ETS in Socorro, New Mexico, United States. It was named for Filipino student Miguel Reyes, a 2011 ISEF awardee.

Orbit and classification 

Miguelreyes is a non-family from the main belt's background population. It orbits the Sun in the central asteroid belt at a distance of 2.5–3.0 AU once every 4 years and 7 months (1,679 days). Its orbit has an eccentricity of 0.09 and an inclination of 4° with respect to the ecliptic.

The asteroid's observation arc begins almost 4 years prior to its official discovery observation, with a precovery taken by the Steward Observatory's Spacewatch survey at Kitt Peakt in April 1996.

Physical characteristics 

According to the survey carried out by the NEOWISE mission of NASA's Wide-field Infrared Survey Explorer, Miguelreyes measures 3.851 kilometers in diameter and its surface has an albedo of 0.249.

Lightcurves 

As of 2018, Miguelreyess spectral type, as well as its rotation period and shape remain unknown.

Naming 

This minor planet was named in honor of Miguel Arnold Silverio Reyes, a Philippine high-school student from Manila, who was awarded second place in the 2011 Intel International Science and Engineering Fair for his materials and bioengineering project entitled "Synthesis and Characterization of Composite Plastics from Thermoplastic Starch and Nano-sized Calcium Phosphate for Film Packaging". His project sought alternatives, such as cornstarch, in making biodegradable plastic for film packaging. He attended the Philippine Science High School in Quezon City, Philippines.

References

External links 
 Asteroid Lightcurve Database (LCDB), query form (info )
 Dictionary of Minor Planet Names, Google books
 Asteroids and comets rotation curves, CdR – Observatoire de Genève, Raoul Behrend
 Discovery Circumstances: Numbered Minor Planets (25001)-(30000) – Minor Planet Center
 
 

028439
028439
Named minor planets
20000103